Pereyra is a surname, a variant of Pereira, and also of Perera. Notable people with the surname include:

Abraham Israel Pereyra (died 1699), very wealthy and important "Portuguese merchant of the Jewish nation," who lived in Amsterdam
Bob Pereyra (born 1963), Street Luge Racer
Carlos Pereyra (disambiguation)
Cristina Pereyra, Venezuelan mathematician
Daniel Pereyra (born 1962), Uruguayan modern pentathlete, competitor in the 1992 Summer Olympics
Darío Pereyra (born 1956), Uruguayan former football player
Gabriel Pereyra (born 1978), Argentine football coach and former player
Gonzalo Rodríguez Pereyra (born 1969), British philosopher born in Argentina
Guillermo Pereyra (born 1980), Argentine-Italian former footballer
Juan Isidro Jimenes Pereyra (1846–1919), Dominican political figure
Juan Pablo Pereyra (born 1984), Argentine football player
Julio César Pereyra (born 1951), the mayor of Florencio Varela, Buenos Aires, Argentina since 2003
Luciano Pereyra (born 1981), Argentine singer
Luis Pereyra (born 1965), dancer and choreographer of Tango Argentino and Argentinian folklore
María del Pilar Pereyra (born 1978), retired female butterfly and freestyle swimmer from Argentina
Marianela Pereyra (born 1979), American model, actress, television personality
Roberto Pereyra (born 1991), Argentine footballer

See also